Peter Stone may refer to:

Pete Stone, Australian footballer in the 1956 Summer Olympics
Peter G. Stone (born 1957), British archaeologist 
Peter Stone (cricketer) (born 1938), New Zealand cricketer
Peter Stone (professor) (born 1971), professor in computer science at the University of Texas at Austin
Peter Stone (soccer, born 1954), Australian footballer
Peter Stone (writer) (1930–2003), American writer

Characters

Peter Stone (Chicago Justice  and Law & Order: Special Victims Unit), a fictional character in Dick Wolf's Chicago and Law & Order franchises
Peter Stone (Degrassi character), fictional character on the television series Degrassi: The Next Generation